Paul Thompson (born November 30, 1988) is an American ice hockey forward who is currently playing with the  Bridgeport Islanders in the American Hockey League (AHL). During the 2010–11 season, he was the Hockey East player of the year, led the Hockey East in scoring, and led the nation in power play goals while playing with the University of New Hampshire.

Playing career
Born in Derry, New Hampshire, Thompson began playing hockey at age five. He became a fan of the UNH hockey team while his elder cousin, Mike Souza, played on the team. He later attended Pinkerton Academy where he played hockey his freshman and sophomore year. While at Pinkerton he also played Baseball and Football. The next two years he played for the New Hampshire Junior Monarchs of the Eastern Junior Hockey League. After scoring fifty one goals in fifty games in the 2006–07 season, Thompson was named the EJHL Offensive Player of the Year. In 2007, he was ranked seventy second among North American hockey players by the NHL Central Scouting Bureau. He was the highest ranked North American player to not be selected in the NHL Entry Draft that year.

He then attended the University of New Hampshire where he is a Health Management major. Thompson scored his first college hat trick on November 17, 2007 in a game against Providence College. In the 2009–10 season he scored thirty nine points, second on the team to Bobby Butler. Thompson is now the highest scoring New Hampshire native on the UNH ice hockey team in the past thirty years. He is a finalist for the 2011 Hobey Baker Award.

In March 2011 he signed a two-year contract with the Pittsburgh Penguins organization. He then began playing for the Wilkes-Barre/Scranton Penguins.

On February 6, 2014, Thompson was traded by the Penguins to the Columbus Blue Jackets in exchange for Spencer Machacek.

As a free agent in the off-season, Thompson signed a one-year AHL contract with the Albany Devils. Prior to the 2014–15 season, he attended NHL parent club, the New Jersey Devils training camp.

On July 1, 2015, Thompson signed a two-year, two-way free agent contract with the New Jersey Devils. To begin the 2015–16 season, Thompson was returned to continue his tenure with the Albany Devils in the AHL. On January 8, 2016, Thompson received his first NHL recall by the Devils, and made his debut that night in a 4-1 defeat to the Boston Bruins. After three scoreless games with New Jersey, Thompson was reassigned to Albany to finish the season, compiling 35 points in 56 games.

On June 10, 2016, the New Jersey Devils traded Thompson along with teammate Graham Black to the Florida Panthers in exchange of Marc Savard's contract and a second-round pick in 2018 NHL Entry Draft.

On July 1, 2017, having left the Panthers as a free agent, Thompson agreed to a one-year, two-way contract with expansion club, the Vegas Golden Knights. In the 2017–18 season, Thompson was reassigned by the Golden Knights to AHL affiliate, the Chicago Wolves, for the duration of the year. He played in every regular season game with the Wolves, posting 24 goals and 38 points.

On July 2, 2018, Thompson opted to return to the Florida Panthers organization as a free agent, securing a two-year, two-way deal.

After concluding his contract within the Panthers organization and Springfield Thunderbirds, Thompson left as a free agent to continue his career in the AHL by signing with the Hartford Wolf Pack, affiliate of the New York Rangers on October 10, 2020.

As a free agent, Thompson extended his career in the following  season, agreeing to a one-year AHL contract with Bridgeport Islanders and assigned to ECHL affiliate, the Worcester Railers, on October 19, 2021.

Career statistics

Awards and honors

References

External links

1988 births
Living people
Albany Devils players
American men's ice hockey forwards
Bridgeport Islanders players
Chicago Wolves players
Florida Panthers players
Hartford Wolf Pack players
Ice hockey people from New Hampshire
New Hampshire Wildcats men's ice hockey players
New Jersey Devils players
People from Derry, New Hampshire
Pinkerton Academy alumni
Sportspeople from Rockingham County, New Hampshire
Springfield Falcons players
Springfield Thunderbirds players
Undrafted National Hockey League players
Wheeling Nailers players
Wilkes-Barre/Scranton Penguins players
Worcester Railers players
AHCA Division I men's ice hockey All-Americans